Judit Jakab (born 23 April 1989) is a Swiss female basketball player of Hungarian descent.

References

External links
Profile at eurobasket.com

1989 births
Living people
Basketball players from Budapest
Naturalised citizens of Switzerland
Swiss people of Hungarian descent
Swiss women's basketball players
Hungarian women's basketball players
Forwards (basketball)